The Mausoleum of Sidi Abderrahmane et-Thaâlibi is a zawiya (Mausoleum) located at the lower Casbah of Algiers, Algeria.

It is honoring the memory of the patron saint of the city, Sidi Abderrahman and-Thaâlibi. It is one of the Zwiyas in Algeria under the supervision of the Ministry of Religious Affairs and Endowments and of the Algerian Religious Reference.

History 
Although Sidi Abderrahman et-Thaâlibi died in 1471, it was not until 1611, during the Ottoman rule in Algeria that it was decided to build a qoubba to house the saint's burial. The fitted qoubba topped with a dome is of the Maghrebi type like those found in Tlemcen or Fez and has similarities with the Saadian tombs, which plan was very popular at the time.

References 

Casbah of Algiers
Buildings and structures in Algiers
Mausoleums in Algeria
Sufism in Algeria